Frank Forcucci is an American football coach and former college baseball player. He is the linebackers coach at the University of New Haven in West Haven, Connecticut, a position he has held since 2021. Forcucci served as the head football coach at Becker College in Leicester, Massachusetts from 2016 until the school closed in 2021. He was hired in 2011 as the defensive coordinator at the University of Massachusetts Amherst.

Head coaching record

College

References

External links
 New Haven profile
 Becker profile
 

Year of birth missing (living people)
Living people
Baseball catchers
Baseball third basemen
Becker Hawks football coaches
Central Connecticut Blue Devils football coaches
Fordham Rams football coaches
New Haven Chargers baseball players
New Haven Chargers football coaches
Northeastern Huskies football coaches
UMass Minutemen football coaches
High school football coaches in Connecticut